is a 1958 Japanese film directed by Michiyoshi Doi.

Cast 
Eri Taira: 
Anna Kamiyama: Mayumi Ozora
Tomohiko Kamiyama: Shuntaro Emi 
Kyohei Tsuyama: Toshio Mimura 
Waka Kashiwagi: Junko Uozumi

See also
List of lesbian, gay, bisexual or transgender-related films

References

External links 
  blog.goo.ne.jp
 *

1950s Japanese-language films
Japanese LGBT-related films
Lesbian-related films
Japanese black-and-white films
1958 films
1950s Japanese films